Boris "Bob" Yavitz (June 4, 1923, Tbilisi – February 14, 2009) was dean of Columbia Business School from 1975 to 1982.  He was credited with restoring the reputation and stability of the school, which had been suffering from a divisive atmosphere before his accession.  He also served as deputy chairman and director of the Federal Reserve Bank of New York from 1977 to 1982.

Yavitz was born in Tbilisi and raised in Tel Aviv. He received a degree at Cambridge.  During World War II he served in the British Navy, then attended Columbia where he received a master's degree in engineering and doctorate in business.

References

1923 births
2009 deaths
Columbia Business School faculty
Columbia School of Engineering and Applied Science alumni
Columbia Business School alumni
Soviet emigrants to Mandatory Palestine
Alumni of the University of Cambridge
Mandatory Palestine expatriates in the United Kingdom
Mandatory Palestine emigrants to the United States
20th-century American academics